Henein is a surname of Egyptian origin. Notable people with the surname include:

 Adam Henein (1929–2020), Egyptian sculptor
 Georges Henein (1914–1973), Egyptian author
 Marie Henein (born 1966), Canadian lawyer
 Maryam Henein, Canadian journalist

See also
 Henlein, surname
 Riskalla Henain (1903–?), Egyptian footballer

Arabic-language surnames